Aire Valley is a rural locality in Victoria, Australia, situated in the Shire of Colac Otway.

A plantation of redwoods lies within the Great Otway National Park in Aire Valley.

References

Towns in Victoria (Australia)